Mordellistenoda ohsumiana is a species of beetle in the genus Mordellistenoda of the family Mordellidae. It was described in 1957.

References

Mordellidae
Beetles described in 1957